St Cuthbert Mayne School is a coeducational secondary school and sixth form located in Torquay in the English county of Devon. The school is named after Saint Cuthbert Mayne, a Roman Catholic priest and martyr of the Reformation and Counter-Reformation.

It is a voluntary aided Roman Catholic and Church of England school administered by the Roman Catholic Diocese of Plymouth, the Church of England Diocese of Exeter and Torbay Council. The school admits pupils from all over Torbay. It is housed in a unique two-story building with a cantilevered glass facade.

References

External links
St Cuthbert Mayne School official website

Secondary schools in Torbay
Schools in Torquay
Catholic secondary schools in the Diocese of Plymouth
Church of England secondary schools in the Diocese of Exeter
Voluntary aided schools in England